Domninus may refer to:

Saints
Saint Domninus or Saint Domnius, also Saint Duje, 3rd-century Syrian martyr-bishop, patron of the city of Split
Saint Domninus of Fidenza (San Donnino di Fidenza) (d. 304)
Saint Domninus of Parma (early 4th century), martyr under Diocletian
Saint Domninus of Thessalonica (early 4th century), martyr (October 1, Eastern Orthodox liturgics)
Saint Domninus of Digne, otherwise Saint Domnin (d. 379)
Saint Domninus of Grenoble (d. 386), first bishop of Grenoble
Saint Domninus of Vienne (d. 536), bishop of Vienne

Others
Domninus of Larissa, 5th-century Hellenistic Syrian Jewish mathematician
Domninus of Antioch (Domnus), patriarch of Antioch (see List of Patriarchs of Antioch)
Domnus II of Antioch
Roman figure in the time of Petronius Maximus
Man whom Serapion of Antioch addresses in one of his works